Robert Edwin Strampe (born June 13, 1950) is an American former professional baseball player and coach.

Baseball career
Strampe was born in Janesville, Wisconsin, where he attended Janesville High School. Originally drafted by the Tigers in the 18th round (414th overall) of the 1968 Major League Baseball Draft, Strampe saw a fair amount of success in the minors as a starter, never posting a season ERA higher than 3.42. Perhaps his best season was his first - 1969 for the Batavia Trojans. In 115 innings of work that year, he went 10-5 with 138 strikeouts and a 2.97 ERA.

He made his major league debut at the age of 21 on May 10, 1972, against the Chicago White Sox. The 6'1", 185 pound right-hander came in to relieve for Ron Perranoski, and didn't have much luck, surviving only 1/3 of an inning. He gave up four hits and a walk, allowing in four earned runs. 

Overall, he pitched in seven games in 1972, posting an ERA of 11.57. In 4 innings, he allowed six hits, seven walks and six earned runs. He struck out only four batters. Although his performance was unimpressive, he did not allow a single home run, which is notable considering the circumstances. He played his final big league game on September 19 of that year. He went out much better than he came in - he struck out the final batter he ever faced, Mike Kilkenny of the Cleveland Indians. He wore number 46 in his only year in Major League Baseball. His father, Bob Strampe, Sr., pitched in the minor leagues in 1934 for the Fargo-Moorhead Twins and Brainerd-Little Falls Muskies.

Although his major league career ended in 1972, Strampe continued to pitch professionally in the minor leagues. He, Ed Brinkman and Dick Sharon were traded from the Tigers to the San Diego Padres for Nate Colbert in a three-team deal on November 18, 1974, that involved Brinkman also being sent to the St. Louis Cardinals for Sonny Siebert, Alan Foster and Rich Folkers. Danny Breeden went from the Padres to the Cardinals to subsequently complete the transactions.

Since at least the late 1990s, Strampe has resided in Cheney, Washington, where he was an assistant baseball coach for the local high school.

References

External links

1950 births
Living people
Major League Baseball pitchers
Detroit Tigers players
Baseball players from Wisconsin
Sportspeople from Janesville, Wisconsin
People from Cheney, Washington
Algodoneros de Unión Laguna players
American expatriate baseball players in Mexico
Batavia Trojans players
Denver Bears players
Evansville Triplets players
Hawaii Islanders players
Montgomery Rebels players
Rocky Mount Leafs players
Saraperos de Saltillo players
Spokane Indians players
Toledo Mud Hens players